Mount Raleigh, elevation , is one of the principal summits of the Pacific Ranges of the Coast Mountains of southern British Columbia in Canada. It is located just southeast of the confluence of the Southgate and Bishop Rivers, northeast of the head of Bute Inlet, and is the highest summit south of the Bishop River's divide with the Lillooet River at Ring Pass, which is at the southeastern edge of the Lillooet Icefield and just north of the Pemberton Icecap.

Name origin
Immediately south of Mount Raleigh in the same massif is Mount Gilbert, named for Raleigh's step-brother Sir Humphrey Gilbert. A bit farther south and slightly west is Tavistock Mountain, named for Raleigh's birthplace in Devon.

Many of these names were conferred in the 1930s by R.P. Bishop, namesake of the Bishop River. His namings, or those connected with him, include Mount Raleigh and Mount Sir Francis Drake, but others such as Mount Sussex, Oriana Peak and Madrigal Mountain were named by nomination of the Alpine Club of Canada in the 1980s.

References

Three-thousanders of British Columbia
Pacific Ranges
Range 1 Coast Land District